Shane Raymond Reti  (born 5 June 1963) is a New Zealand politician and a member of the New Zealand House of Representatives, first elected at the 2014 general election. He is a member of the New Zealand National Party and served as its deputy leader from 10 November 2020 to 30 November 2021 including a period of five days as interim leader following the ousting of Judith Collins.

Early life and family
Born in Hamilton in 1963, Reti is of Māori descent, and has tribal affiliations to Ngāpuhi, Ngāti Hine, Ngāti Wai, Te Kapotai and Ngāti Maniapoto. He was educated at Hamilton Boys' High School and Minidoka County High School in Rupert, Idaho, United States. He then studied at the University of Waikato from 1981 to 1982 and the University of Auckland between 1982 and 1987 and in 1989, graduating from the latter with a Bachelor of Human Biology in 1985, MB ChB in 1987 and a Diploma in Obstetrics in 1989. He was also awarded a Diploma in Dermatological Science by the University of Wales, Cardiff in 1991.

Reti served in the Territorial Force from 1983 to 1987. He played badminton for Waikato between 1978 and 1982.

Professional career
Reti worked as a general practitioner for 17 years. For seven years and three consecutive terms he served as a member of the Northland District Health Board. In the 2006 New Year Honours he was awarded a Queen's Service Medal for public services.

In 2007 Reti was awarded a NZ Harkness Fellowship to Harvard Medical School and moved to Massachusetts to work at Harvard University. Reti remained in Boston for six years and claims to have resisted offers by Beth Israel Deaconess Medical Center and Harvard Medical School to extend his stay.

Reti has continued to be a practising doctor during his time in parliament. In 2019 Reti was one of a team who administered the meningococcal vaccine at Hikurangi primary school after the local community raised money to buy the vaccine. In 2021 Reti travelled Northland administering COVID-19 vaccinations.  In 2021 industry publication New Zealand Doctor indicated that having a doctor high up is important to the profession, announcing "Shane Reti is the first GP, and first medical practitioner, to become leader of the National Party".

Political career

Fifth National Government, 2014–2017

During the Northland by-election, Reti was accused of bullying Alex Wright of the Pipiwai Titoki Advocacy group, a group campaigning to seal the "dusty and dangerous foresty roads" in Northland. Wright claimed that Reti rang her and told her to keep quiet until after the by-election or get nothing. Reti responded that he was attempting to help the group.

Sixth Labour Government, 2017–present

Following the formation of the Labour-led coalition government, Reti became National's Associate Spokesperson for Health and Deputy Chaiperson of the Health Select Committee. He was later appointed as the party's spokesperson for data and cybersecurity and for disability issues. In January 2019, Reti was designated as National's spokesperson for tertiary education, skills, and employment. Between 25 March and 26 May 2020, Reti was a member of the Epidemic Response Committee, a select committee that considered the government's response to the COVID-19 pandemic. On 2 July, Reti was promoted to number 13 on the National Party's list ranking within Todd Muller's shadow cabinet and also given the associate drug reform portfolio. On 15 July 2020, Judith Collins, the new Leader of the Opposition, announced that Reti was to be promoted to Spokesperson for Health for National.

During the 2020 New Zealand general election held on 17 October, preliminary results had Reti ahead of Labour candidate Emily Henderson in the Whangārei electorate by 162 votes. Following the publication of official results on 6 November, he lost the seat to Henderson by 431 votes. He returned to Parliament on the National Party list.

 
On 10 November, Reti was unanimously elected as the deputy leader of the National Party during a party caucus meeting.

In mid November 2021, Reti briefly served as interim leader of the National Party after Judith Collins lost a vote of no confidence. On 30 November, he was succeeded by Christopher Luxon, who became the party's new leader and the new Leader of the Opposition.

On 17 January 2022, Reti successfully petitioned SpaceX CEO Elon Musk to provide Starlink satellite technology to Tonga after the Hunga Tonga–Hunga Ha'apai tsunami.  Tonga lost internet connectivity to the world after the underwater cables were ruptured during the eruption and resulting tsunami.  Reti did not have a pre-existing relationship with Musk but reasoned that "I guess Elon Musk can only say no and if you don't ask you don't know". In response Musk's SpaceX set up a free high-speed internet service for the affected remote islands, to remain until they could be reconnected by cable. In acknowledging the 50 VSAT terminals provided free of charge the Tongan Prime Minister, Siaosi Sovaleni, said "It is rather paradoxical for a devastating volcanic eruption and tsunami to bring to our shores the latest in satellite and communications technology".

In March 2022, the New Zealand Herald removed an opinion piece Reti had written. In it, he claimed that self-harm had increased during the COVID-19 pandemic; other journalists using the same data found the opposite, and a data journalist for the Herald called the graphs in the article "poor and misleading".

In mid-March 2022, Reti was moved up from fifth to fourth place during a reshuffle of Luxon's shadow cabinet.

Political positions

Medical marijuana 
Reti authored a private members bill in 2018 that would have extended access to medical, but not recreational, marijuana.

Euthanasia
Reti voted against the End of Life Choice Act 2019.

Abortion
Reti voted against the Abortion Legislation Act 2020.

When asked for his comments on the overturning of Roe v Wade in the United States, and whether similar changes could take place in New Zealand, Reti stated "That would always be a decision for caucus, and so I'm not going to offer a position here now, but we are mindful in watching what happens with Roe vs Wade".

Obesity
In mid-November 2020, Reti supported National Party leader Judith Collins' earlier remarks about obesity being a matter of personal responsibility. Reti said that National had a "good obesity framework" and that people could be trusted to make the right choice with the "right information." While acknowledging that socio-economic and genetics were factors in obesity, he added there were other reasons including medical factors for putting on weight.

Cancer treatment access 
Reti authored a private members bill  to allow unfunded cancer medication to be administered in public hospitals. Under the bill patients would continue to pay the cost of unfunded medicines, but not for the administration of them. The bill was drawn from the ballot in 2021.

Fluoridation 
Reti is a supporter of fluoridation, having self-sponsored work to implement it in Northland  but did not support removing fluoridation decisions from the local DHB.

Conversion therapy ban
Reti was one of only eight MPs to vote against the Conversion Practices Prohibition Legislation Act 2022. The then-leader of the National Party Judith Collins instructed all National MPs to vote against the bill at its first reading, and as party deputy leader Reti defended the party's position and sought to add an exemption to the bill for parents regarding bill. National's leadership changed to Christopher Luxon who allowed his MPs to vote according to their conscience; Reti voted against the bill at its second reading, and at its third and final reading. Reti said he abhors conversion therapy but "What is not clear in the bill is the protection of reasonable parents having reasonable conversations with their children."

Personal life
Reti has three adult children: two daughters and one son. Reti was raised a Mormon but no longer attends church.

References

|-

1963 births
Living people
Ngāpuhi people
Ngāti Wai people
Ngāti Hine people
People from Hamilton, New Zealand
People educated at Hamilton Boys' High School
University of Waikato alumni
University of Auckland alumni
Alumni of Cardiff University
New Zealand Māori medical doctors
New Zealand National Party MPs
Members of the New Zealand House of Representatives
New Zealand MPs for North Island electorates
Harkness Fellows
Recipients of the Queen's Service Medal
New Zealand Māori sportspeople
21st-century New Zealand politicians
20th-century New Zealand medical doctors
Candidates in the 2017 New Zealand general election
Māori politicians
Northland District Health Board members
New Zealand list MPs
Deputy opposition leaders